Nickel Diner is a Los Angeles, California, restaurant known for its versions of diner food including  dishes a maple-glaze bacon doughnut, baked eggs, steak sandwich, and catfish.

Fixtures and fittings 

The window is decorated with mannequin heads including a Marie Antoinette and TV chef Guy Fieri, who visited the restaurant in 2009 to film part of an episode of Diners, Drive-Ins and Dives. Some of the light fixtures are floor lamps glued upside down to the ceiling. The restaurant occupies the site of a long-forgotten diner, hand-painted wall menus with prices last current in the late 1940s.

Critical praise 

LA Weekly has described Nickel Diner as "an unlikely success", stepping from "what used to be considered the most notorious intersection in town".

The Los Angeles Times guide refers to the restaurant as a "trendy new diner" that is "located on a historic stretch of Main Street between Fifth and Sixth streets." and claim that "Inside you're greeted with a picture-perfect model of a pre-WWII-era diner. High ceilings, vintage wallpaper, wooden tables, scuffed tile floors, cushy red leather booths and an old-school, lunch counter-style open kitchen make for a historically sentimental scene." and also say that "The Nickel dishes up a big helping of downtown L.A."

Los Angeles magazine names Nickel Diner as one of the three best restaurants in LA.

References

External links 
 

2008 establishments in California
Restaurants established in 2008
Restaurants in Los Angeles